Ambatomainty is a town and commune in Madagascar. It belongs to the district of Amparafaravola, which is a part of Alaotra-Mangoro Region. The population of the commune was estimated to be approximately 39,000 in 2001 commune census.

Ambatomainty is served by a local airport. Primary and junior level secondary education are available in town. The majority 94% of the population of the commune are farmers.  The most important crop is rice, while other important products are maize and cassava.  Services provide employment for 1% of the population. Additionally fishing employs 5% of the population.

References and notes 

Populated places in Alaotra-Mangoro